Truman High School may refer to:

 Truman High School (Independence, Missouri)
 Harry S. Truman High School (Federal Way), Washington
 Harry S Truman High School (Levittown, Pennsylvania), Pennsylvania
 Harry S. Truman High School (Bronx), New York
 Harry S. Truman High School (Taylor, Michigan)

See also
 Trumann High School, Trumann, Arkansas